Christian Friedrich August Bloedner was a German-born carpenter from Cincinnati, who served with the 32nd Regiment Indiana Infantry during the American Civil War.  He built the 32nd Indiana Monument.

Biography

August Bloedner was born around 1825 in Altenburg, Saxe-Altenburg, Germany.  Emigrating to the United States, he lived in Cincinnati, Ohio until enlisting in the 32nd Regiment Indiana Infantry in August 1861. He commemorated the deaths of his comrades killed in action at the Battle of Rowlett's Station, Kentucky, in December 1861, by building the first American Civil War monument.  This was the 32nd Indiana Monument, completed in January 1862.   It was placed in Cave Hill Cemetery in Louisville, Kentucky after the Civil War.

Following the conclusion of the war,  Bloedner returned to Cincinnati, where he worked as a marble and stone cutter until his death from heart disease on November 14, 1872.

References

External links

German Indiana Regt. Monument To be Preserved

1872 deaths
German emigrants to the United States
Military personnel from Cincinnati
People from Saxe-Altenburg
Union Army soldiers
People of Ohio in the American Civil War
1825 births
Burials at Vine Street Hill Cemetery